Sudarshani Fernandopulle (Sinhala:සුදර්ශනි ප්‍රනාන්දුපුල්ලේ) MP (born 29 October 1960) is a Specialist Medical Officer of Community Medicine. Currently  she represents the Parliament of Sri Lanka for the United People's Freedom Alliance from Gampaha District and is the State Minister of COVID19 control, Primary Healthcare and Epidemics in Sri Lanka. Previously, she was appointed the Deputy Minister of Higher Education on 22 March 2015 in the First National Government of Sri Lanka.

External links

Parliament profile

1960 births
Living people
Sinhalese physicians
Sri Lankan Roman Catholics
Members of the 14th Parliament of Sri Lanka
Members of the 15th Parliament of Sri Lanka
Members of the 16th Parliament of Sri Lanka
Sri Lanka Podujana Peramuna politicians
Women legislators in Sri Lanka
21st-century Sri Lankan women politicians